The 2004 Top League Challenge Series was the 2004 edition of the Top League Challenge Series, a second-tier rugby union competition in Japan, in which teams from regionalised leagues competed for promotion to the Top League for the 2004–05 season. The competition was contested from 10 to 24 January 2004.

IBM Big Blue and Toyota Verblitz won promotion to the 2004–05 Top League, while Kyuden Voltex and Toyota Industries Shuttles progressed to the promotion play-offs.

Competition rules and information

The top two teams from the regional Top East League, Top West League and Top Kyūshū League qualified to the Top League Challenge Series. The regional league winners participated in Challenge 1, while the runners-up participated in Challenge 2.

The top two teams in Challenge 1 won automatic promotion to the 2004–05 Top League, while the third-placed team in Challenge 1 and the Challenge 2 winner qualified to the promotion play-offs.

Qualification

The teams qualified to the Challenge 1 and Challenge 2 series through the 2003 regional leagues.

Top West League

The final standings for the 2003 Top West League were:

 Toyota Verblitz qualified for Challenge 1.
 Toyota Industries Shuttles qualified for Challenge 2.

Top East League

The final standings for the 2003 Top East League were:

 IBM Big Blue qualified for Challenge 1.
 Kamaishi Seawaves qualified for Challenge 2 after a play-off series involving them, Mitsubishi Sagamihara DynaBoars and NTT Burns.

The following matches were played:

Top Kyūshū League

The final standings for the 2003 Top Kyūshū League were:

 Chugoku Electric Power, Coca-Cola West Red Sparks and Kyuden Voltex qualified to the Second Phase.

 Kyuden Voltex qualified for Challenge 1.
 Coca-Cola West Red Sparks qualified for Challenge 2.

Challenge 1

Standings

The final standings for the 2004 Top League Challenge 1 were:

 IBM Big Blue and Toyota Verblitz won promotion to the 2004–05 Top League.
 Kyuden Voltex progressed to the promotion play-offs.

Matches

The following matches were played in the 2004 Top League Challenge 1:

Challenge 2

Standings

The final standings for the 2004 Top League Challenge 2 were:

 Toyota Industries Shuttles progressed to the promotion play-offs.
 Coca-Cola West Red Sparks and Kamaishi Seawaves remain in the regional leagues.

Matches

The following matches were played in the 2004 Top League Challenge 2:

See also

 2003–04 Top League
 Top League Challenge Series

References

2004 Challenge
2003–04 in Japanese rugby union
2004 rugby union tournaments for clubs